House of the Dragon: Season 1 is the soundtrack album for the first season of the HBO television series House of the Dragon, an independent prequel to Game of Thrones (2011–2019). Ramin Djawadi, who composed for Game of Thrones, returned to score for the series. Djawadi wanted the score to "keep the DNA alive from the original show", hence he created some cues based on the themes from the original show, but included new themes for the characters involved. He also experimented with instrumentation to create a minor difference from the original show. The album was led by four singles — "The Prince That Was Promised", "Protector of the Realm", "Lament" and "Fate of the Kingdoms" — released on August 18, October 9 and 16, 2022. The 44-track score album was released by WaterTower Music on October 24, 2022, a day after the season finale premiered.

Background and development 
Ramin Djawadi signed to compose the score for House of the Dragon in October 2020. The series was a prequel to Game of Thrones, and to establish the connection, Djawadi had blended themes from the series, so that he could "keep the DNA of the original show alive". In a video interview to David Griffin at IGN's State of Streaming 2022, Djawadi explained on the incorporation of Game of Thrones title theme in the second episode, and thought it as a "good example of tying the older material back into the newer themes", and continued "as a franchise to just connect all of these stories together. In the original main title, we always looked at and thought of it as an overarching theme that connects all of the characters and the journey and the adventures of this universe. So we felt it would be appropriate to connect it with this main title theme again." He also opined that House of the Dragon is also an interpretation of Game of Thrones, though being set 100 years before.

Djawadi also produced new music to the franchise, as each character has their own themes outside their connection to the overarching themes. Unlike Game of Thrones, which focuses on several families, House of the Dragon deals with the Targaryens within the family. Djawadi felt that the dragon theme was the "overarching Targaryen theme", but he later focused on the other characters, such as Rhaenyra, Daemon, Alicent and Viserys, and created multiple themes focusing on the family. The music of House of the Dragon mainly focuses on Daemon and Rhaenyra. He called the theme from Rhaenyra as his favourite theme, as it was slightly departed from the original tone, and felt that "Whenever that comes up, it always just feels really cool. I feel it gives her a lot of power. The first time she flew in on the dragon, and then when she leaves and that theme plays, in episode three, that’s the first time we hear it." He also created another theme for Rhaenyra, which was an emotional theme. But for the first vocal theme, Djawadi felt that as "a new part of the sound palette and that’s been fun to write. I’m still looking creatively [for if there is] something that I haven’t used that could be fitting for this character or this family."

He was mentored by the showrunners Miguel Sapochnik and Ryan Condal to understand the show and also providing the apt tone for the visuals. While producing the score, he discussed with Sapochnik and Condal on how to use the music for particular sequences, and how the instrumentation should occur. All of the music he wrote, were being sampled into digital demos, for the showrunners to play them and watch the show, to see how the music fits in the picture, and later discuss on editing the cues, after which the score is being recorded. Djawadi mentioned it as the "spotting session" in which he decides where music should and should not be placed, and added "...we tweak right up until the very end when the show has to be finalized because most times when we discuss the music, the visuals are not finished. The visual effects, the sound effects. Everything happens in parallel. So sometimes you wind up doing what we call overscoring, where you put too much music in the show [...] You make these decisions until the very end. And it's always a tricky thing to get the balance just right. I think it's really well done in House of the Dragon and Game of Thrones. Like you said, sometimes, having no music can be more powerful than actually playing something because music always enhances things. Sometimes, not enhancing a scene can make it more awkward, more scary or more emotional."

Composition 
As similar to Game of Thrones, the cello was used as the primary instruments in House of the Dragon. However, Djawadi made minor adjustments on the instrumentation, which he referred as the total instrumental swap, on comparing the musical identities with the two series. He did not use the solo violin, but used the viola, which had "a little bit lower in range and different tambor". He used newer instruments, such as the ethnic bamboo flutes and woodwinds, alongside multiple instruments. Djawadi wanted to " push the cello up into the violin range [because] there is a thickness to it up higher than the violin and I like that sound. It’s the same with the viola — obviously the viola can play lower than the violin, but even if the viola plays higher, it has a different timbre."

In the fifth episode, during Rhaenyra's pre-wedding dance sequence, Djawadi said that the music was written even before the shooting had started, as "the music had to be there first so they could choreograph the dancing to it". Hence, he read the script and discussed on how the scene comes to fruition. Djawadi said "We have the drums, and it’s just maybe not what you’d expect of wedding music—tribal isn’t the right word, but the percussive element, there’s definitely a strong background of that there. So it was fun to write it and see how they shot the scene to it. And then later it turns into score, obviously, when it all goes crazy, but I think there were three pieces I had to write before. So they were written, like, over a year ago." He also mentioned Rhaenys' grand entrance during the coronation as one of his "favorite musical moments of the show so far", where the scene transitioned from "celebration mode to pure chaos in an instant" and the music syncs as Alicent's eyes close. He also included the main title theme in the concluding moments, which he did with the balance of sound effects.

Track listing

Reception 
Ramin Djawadi's score received acclaim from critics and audiences alike, and has been noted as the show's best aspects. GamesRadar+ writer Molly Edwards had stated that the soundtrack "has been consistently brilliant, just as it was across Game of Thrones, with a perfectly balanced mix of old and new themes". Eric Kain, senior writer for Forbes, had called the score for the seventh episode (and overall season) had "some of the most gorgeous music that Ramin Djawadi has ever written, for this or any other show including Game Of Thrones (2011–2019) and Westworld (2016–present)." Alec Bojabad of Den of Geek, reviewing the ninth episode of the series, had stated "composer Ramin Djawadi dusts off his “big episode piano” for an unnerving stringy score that harkens back to the astonishing music of season 6's 'The Winds of Winter'." While the reuse of the Game of Thrones title theme in the second episode, had been praised by fans, Belen Edwards of Mashable called the decision as "the greatest flaw" as she said: "The song itself still proves to be the ultimate hype man for an hour of fantasy TV goodness. But recycling it for the Game of Thrones prequel reads as a calculated nostalgia grab for fans of the original show. Worse, it suggests that the creative team behind House of the Dragon isn't quite ready to let this new series stand by itself. With a new opening sequence and theme song, House of the Dragon could have asserted its own identity as a series."

Live concert tour 
Speaking of the live concert performance, Djawadi earlier said to The Recording Academy, that he did not conduct a concert tour for Game of Thrones until the sixth season in 2017. Though, House of the Dragon is still in its first season, there is much of the score that would be feasible for a concert performance; Djawadi had said about the possibilities of a future concert tour for House of the Dragon, stating that "it was very special to connect with the audience. I'm always in my studio by myself, and being out there and seeing the reactions from the crowd when you play those epic scenes along with the music was fantastic."

See also 

 Music of Game of Thrones

References 

2022 soundtrack albums
Music of Game of Thrones
Classical music soundtracks
Television soundtracks
Ramin Djawadi soundtracks
WaterTower Music soundtracks